Kies is the remnant of a lunar impact crater that has been flooded by basaltic lava, leaving only a remnant of the outer rim. It was named after German mathematician and astronomer Johann Kies. It is located in the Mare Nubium almost due south of the crater Bullialdus. Northwest of Kies is König. To the south-southwest lies a lunar dome structure designated Kies Pi (π). It has a small crater at the top and is most likely volcanic in origin.

The rim of Kies has numerous gaps and forms a series of ridges in a ring-shaped formation. The most intact rim structures lie in the south and northeast sections of the wall. A low promontory ridge is attached to the southern end of the rim, pointing southwards.

Rays from Tycho crater, located far to the southeast, cross Kies and the surrounding mare.

Satellite craters
By convention these features are identified on lunar maps by placing the letter on the side of the crater midpoint that is closest to Kies.

References

Bibliography
 
 
 
 
 
 
 
 
 
 
 

Impact craters on the Moon